Turakirae Head is a promontory on the southern coast of New Zealand's North Island. It is located at the western end of Palliser Bay, 20 kilometres southeast of Wellington, at the southern end of the Remutaka Range. The head is an excellent example of tectonic uplift within the Wellington region. There are a series of raised terraces which show where the shoreline existed prior to large seismic events. The  Turakirae Head is also home to a seal colony and southern bull kelp.

Turakirae also marks the southernmost coastal boundary point for the Ngāti Kahungunu tribe which extends as north as Paritu which is just north south of Gisborne.

References

Headlands of the Wellington Region
Cook Strait